Problepsis crassinotata is a species of moth of the  family Geometridae. It is found in India, Thailand, China, and Taiwan.

The wingspan is 38–42 mm.

References

Moths described in 1917
Scopulini
Moths of Asia